Dança dos Famosos 4 was the fourth season of Brazilian reality television show Dança dos Famosos which premiered March 11, 2007 and ended June 17, 2007 on the Rede Globo television network.

Ten celebrities were paired with ten professional ballroom dancers, a decrease over the previous seasons. Faustão and Adriana Colin were the hosts for this season.

Actor & model Rodrigo Hilbert won the competition over actress Elaine Mickely.

Overview

 The season follows the same split-by-gender style from the last couple of seasons.

Couples

The twelve professionals and celebrities that competed were:

Scoring chart

Average chart

This table only counts dances scored on the traditional 50-point scale.

Weekly results

Week 1 
Week 1 – Men
Style: Bolero
Aired: March 11, 2007

Week 2 
Week 1 – Women
Style: Bolero
Aired: March 18, 2007

Week 3 
Week 2 – Men
Style: Forró
Aired: March 25, 2007

Week 4 
Week 2 – Women
Style: Forró
Aired: April 1, 2007

Week 5 
Repechage
Style: Rock and Roll
Aired: April 8, 2007

Week 6 
Top 9
Style: Disco
Aired: April 15, 2007

Week 7 
Top 8
Style: Samba
Aired: April 22, 2007

Week 8 
Top 7
Style: Salsa
Aired: April 29, 2007

Week 9 
Top 6
Style: Lambada
Aired: May 13, 2007

Week 10 
Top 5
Style: Maxixe
Aired: May 20, 2007

Week 11 
Top 4 – Week 1
Style: Foxtrot & Paso Doble
Aired: May 27, 2007

Week 12 
Top 4 – Week 2
Style: Waltz & Gypsy
Aired: June 3, 2007

Week 13 
Top 2
Style: Zouk, Tango and Surprise Dance (Disco for Elaine and Salsa for Rodrigo)
Aired: June 17, 2007

References

External links
 Official Site 

Season 04
2007 Brazilian television seasons

pt:Dança dos Famosos 4